Minuscule 151 (in the Gregory-Aland numbering), A17 (Soden), is a Greek minuscule manuscript of the New Testament, on parchment leaves. Palaeographically it has been assigned to the 10th century. The manuscript has complex contents. It has marginalia.

Description 

The codex contains a complete text of the four Gospels on 224 parchment leaves (size ) with a commentary.

The text is written in one column per page, in 28 lines per page. Ink is black, the capital letters in colour and gold.

There is also another division according to the smaller Ammonian Sections (in Mark 241, last numbered section in 16:20), without references to the Eusebian Canons (written below Ammonian Section numbers).

Hebrew words explained at the beginning.

Text 

The Greek text of the codex is a representative of the Byzantine text-type. Aland placed it in Category V.
According to the Claremont Profile Method it represents the textual family Kx in Luke 1, Luke 10, and Luke 20. It belongs to the textual cluster Ω.

The spurious texts of Matthew 16:2b–3 (signs of the times) and the Pericope Adulterae (John 7:53-8:11) are omitted.

It contains some rare readings (e.g. John 19:14).

History 

Birch and Scrivener dated it to the 11th century. Currently it is dated by the INTF to the 10th century.

It was examined by Birch (about 1782) and Scholz. C. R. Gregory saw it in 1886.

Text of Mark 16:8-20 of the codex was used by Cardinal Angelo Mai in his edition of the text of Codex Vaticanus Graecus 1209 ("pseudo-facsimile" published posthumously in 1857).

It is currently housed at the Vatican Library (Pal. gr. 220), at Rome.

See also 

 List of New Testament minuscules
 Biblical manuscript
 Textual criticism

References

Further reading

External links 
 

Greek New Testament minuscules
10th-century biblical manuscripts
Manuscripts of the Vatican Library